Chris Andrews may refer to:
 Chris Andrews (singer) (born 1942), pop musician and songwriter ("Yesterday Man")
 Chris Andrews (entrepreneur) (1956–2012), digital pioneer, restitution activist
 Chris Andrews (translator) (born 1962), Melbourne-based poet and translator
 Chris Andrews (politician) (born 1964), Irish Sinn Féin (and formerly Fianna Fáil) politician
 Chris Andrews (rower), ocean rower
 Chris Andrews (wrestler) (born 1984), professional wrestler from Crediton, Devon

See also
 Christopher Andrews (disambiguation)